Jerome Svigals  (June 8, 1927 – November 11, 2018) was an American engineer and author instrumental in the development of  magnetic stripes on credit cards and in the adoption of smart card technology.

Svigals was a member of the SPREAD task force that proposed what became the IBM System 360.

References 

1927 births
2018 deaths
American engineers
American writers
IBM employees
People from the Bronx